The 2009 Men's Queensland Basketball League season was the 24th running of the competition. The Cairns Marlins won the championship in 2009 to claim their seventh league title.

The teams for this season were: Brisbane Capitals, Bundaberg Bulls, Caboolture Suns, Cairns Marlins, Gladstone Port City Power, Gold Coast Goannas, Ipswich Force, Mackay Meteors, Maroochydore Clippers, Northside Wizards, Rockhampton Rockets, South West Metro Pirates, Toowoomba Mountaineers and Townsville Heat.

Team information

Finals
QF 1: 1st in Pool A vs. 2nd in Pool A
QF 2: 1st in Pool B vs. 2nd in Pool B
QF 3: 1st in Pool C vs. 2nd in Pool C

*The team that finishes 1st overall goes straight through to the semi-finals.

Awards

Player of the Week

Coach of the Month

Statistics leaders

Regular season
 Most Valuable Player: Cameron Tragardh (Northside Wizards)
 Coach of the Year: Leonard King (Mackay Meteors)
 U23 Youth Player of the Year: Jonothan Mines (South West Metro Pirates)
 All-League Team:
 G: Rhys Martin (Rockhampton Rockets)
 G: Scott Cook (Mackay Meteors)
 F: Reggie Golson (Rockhampton Rockets)
 F: Aaron Grabau (Cairns Marlins)
 C: Cameron Tragardh (Northside Wizards)

Finals
 Grand Final MVP: Kerry Williams (Cairns Marlins)

References

External links
 2009 QBL Official Draw
 2009 QBL news
 Quarter-finals preview
 Semi-finals preview
 Power claim 1st title with Marlins racking up no. 7
 Basketball Queensland end-of-year wrap

2009
2008–09 in Australian basketball
2009–10 in Australian basketball